Swansea City Ladies Football Club is a women's football club based in Swansea, Wales, currently playing in the Adran Premier, the top level of female competition in Wales.

History

Formed in 2002, the team were members of the inaugural Welsh Premier Women's League in 2009/10 and came top of the Southern Conference, winning all six of their matches.

This set up a meeting with Northern winners, Caernarfon Town Ladies, with the winner clinching the title and becoming Wales' representatives in the UEFA Women's Champions League.

They beat the Canaries 4–0 at Haverfordwest to qualify for Europe for the very first time.
For the first time Swansea qualified to UEFA competitions in 2010 after winning the Welsh Premier League. As Wales is not in the top leagues by the UEFA coefficient for women, the team had to go through the qualifying stage of the UEFA Women's Champions League. Swansea City were drawn out in Group 5 and paired with ŽNK Krka (Slovenia) – who hosted the mini group – top seeds CF Bardolino Verona (Italy) and FC Baia Zugdidi (Georgia). Swansea achieved one win in its group, beating Baia Zugdidi 2–1 and ended the group on place 3 of 4, thus failing to move on to the knockout stages.

They defended their title in 2011 again against Caernarfon with a 3–1 final win, thus would participate in the 2011–12 UEFA Women's Champions League.

19 April 2015 Swansea Beat Cardiff City Women's 4–2 in the FAW Women's Cup.

On 28 April 2016, Swansea beat PILCS in the Welsh Premier Women's League Cup 4–0.

In the 2016/2017 they lost the first game of the season in a thrilling 5–4 contest at home to Abergavenny. They then went on to remain unbeaten the whole season, winning the league comfortably, and crowned champions after a 4–0 win against Cyncoed. Setting the girls up for a return to Europe. The girls headed to Cluj, Romania, where they played Hibernian, Olimpia Cluj and Zhytlobud-2.

Returning home after Champions League, the women went on to secure second in the league after a tough campaign. They did win the FAW Cup, 2–1 with goals coming from Jodie Passmore and Katy Hosford to beat Cardiff City at the Cardiff City Stadium, bring the FAW cup home to Liberty Stadium in Swansea.

2022-2023

Champions League

Swansea City were drawn against tournament hosts and Greek champions PAOK in the first round of the qualifying bracket.

Despite a valiant effort, Swansea lost 2-0 against PAOK to bow out of the 2022–23 UEFA Women's Champions League in the First Round of Qualifying.

Players

Current squad

Honours
Adran Premier:
Champions (1): 2021-2022
Welsh Premier Women's League:
 Champions (5): 2009–10, 2010–11, 2016–17, 2019-20, 2020-21
Runners-up: 2014–15, 2015–16, 2017–18, 2018–19
Welsh Women's Cup:
Champions (3): 2011, 2015, 2018
Runners-up: 2014, 2017
Welsh Women's Premier League Cup:
 Champions (1): 2016
Runners-up: 2015, 2019
South Wales Women's League 
Champions: 2006–07, 2007–08, 2008–09, 2009–10, 2011–12
South Wales Women's League Cup 
Champions: 2007, 2008

Record in UEFA Women's Champions League

Summary

By season

Coaching staff
Updated: August 15th 2022

References

External links
Team's website
Club at uefa.com

Ladies
Association football clubs established in 2002
Women's football clubs in Wales
2002 establishments in Wales
Welsh Premier Women's Football League clubs